Parfyonovo is a rural locality (a selo) Parfyonovsky Selsoviet, Topchikhinsky District, Altai Krai, Russia. The population was 1,349 as of 2013. There are 25 streets.

Geography 
Parfyonovo is located on the Priobskoye Plato, 30 km west of Topchikha (the district's administrative centre) by road. Komsomolsky is the nearest rural locality.

References 

Rural localities in Topchikhinsky District